Donna Jean Hrinak (born March 28, 1951) is an American lawyer and former diplomat who has been the president of Boeing Latin America & Caribbean since September 2011.

Early life and education 
Hrinak was born in Pennsylvania on March 28, 1951. She speaks Spanish, Portuguese, and Polish, which served her through her international diplomatic and business postings. Hrinak earned a Bachelor of Arts degree in social sciences from Michigan State University and a Juris Doctor from Notre Dame Law School.

Career

Foreign affairs  
In 1994, Hrinak served as the United States Department of State's coordinator for policy at the First Summit of the Americas.

Later in 1994, Hrinak was nominated by Bill Clinton to be the United States Ambassador to the Dominican Republic. In 1997, she was appointed ambassador to Bolivia. From 2000 to 2002, she was ambassador to Venezuela.

Hrinak served as Ambassador to Brazil from 2002 to 2004 under the presidency of George W. Bush.

Business and law 
In 2004, Hrinak became a senior counselor for international trade and government affairs at Steel Hector & Davis, an international law firm in Miami, Florida.

Hrinak became a corporate affairs director for the Latin American and European Union sectors of Kraft Foods. In 2008, Hrinak joined PepsiCo as vice president of global public policy and government affairs.

In 2011, Hrinak was appointed as president of Boeing Brazil. In 2019, Hrinak became the president of Boeing Latin America and Canada.

Awards and recognition 
The Miami chapter of the Organization of Women in International Trade named Hrinak international businesswoman of the year, in 2005. Her other honors include the U.S. State Department's Career Achievement Award and the U.S. Coast Guard's Distinguished Public Service Award. Hrinak is currently a member of the board of directors of the Council on Foreign Relations and the board of counselors of McLarty Associates. She is also a member of Washington D.C. based think tank the Inter-American Dialogue.

Personal life 
Hrinak has a son, Wyatt.

References

External links

1951 births
Living people
Ambassadors of the United States to the Dominican Republic
Ambassadors of the United States to Bolivia
Ambassadors of the United States to Venezuela
Ambassadors of the United States to Brazil
American women ambassadors
American women lawyers
American lawyers
Michigan State University alumni
George Washington University alumni
Notre Dame Law School alumni
People from Pennsylvania
Boeing people
American women business executives
Members of the Inter-American Dialogue